Heřmanice is a municipality and village in Liberec District in the Liberec Region of the Czech Republic. It has about 300 inhabitants.

Etymology
The original German name of the village was Hermannsdorff, meaning "Herman's village". It was gradually distorted into Hermsdorf. The Czech name was created by translation.

Geography
The northern part of the municipal territory with the built-up area lies in the Frýdlant Hills. The Oleška Stream flows through the municipality.

History
The first written mention of Heřmanice is from 1381. There is an even older mention in the Zittau annals, but the date of 1375 is only an estimate. Heřmanice was then part of the Frýdlant estate, owned by the Biberstein family until 1544. The Schwanitz family held the village from 1544 to 1668. In 1678, Heřmanice was again joined to the Frýdlant estate and was owned by the Clam-Gallas family.

In 1900, a railway from Frýdlant to Zittau via Heřmanice was built. The railway was in service until 1976.

In 1938, the municipality was annexed by Nazi Germany and administered as part of Reichsgau Sudetenland. After the World War II, the German population was expelled and the number of inhabitants dropped.

In 1960, Heřmanice merged with the neighbouring municipality of Dětřichov. From 1986 to 1990, it was an administrative part of Frýdlant. Since 1 September 1990, it has been a separate municipality.

The village was hit by floods in summer 2010. The whole infrastructure of the village was destroyed. Many houses were damaged, several houses were demolished. One woman died.

Demographics

Transport
There is a road border crossing with Poland Heřmanice / Bogatynia.

Sights

In Heřmanice there are several half-timbered houses, built in the so-called Upper Lusatian style.

A wooden observation tower was built in Heřmanice in 2012.

Twin towns – sister cities

Heřmanice is twinned with:
 Pieńsk, Poland
 Sobota (Lwówek Śląski), Poland

References

External links

Villages in Liberec District